Horst Schulze (26 April 1921 – 24 October 2018) was a German actor and opera singer. He was born in Dresden and died in Berlin at the age of 97.

Filmography

References

External links

1921 births
2018 deaths
Actors from Dresden
East German actors
German male film actors
German male television actors
Academic staff of the Hochschule für Musik Hanns Eisler Berlin